Niki Agathia Football Club is a Greek football club based in Agathia, Imathia, Greece.

Honours

Domestic

 Imathia FCA champion: 4
 1991–92, 1994–95, 2007–08, 2017–18
 Imathia FCA Cup Winners : 2
 1993–94, 1996–97

References

Football clubs in Central Macedonia
Imathia
Association football clubs established in 1966
1966 establishments in Greece
Gamma Ethniki clubs